The Mini Great Wall or Little Great Wall is a hiking trail on Cheung Chau, an island of Hong Kong.

Constructed in 1997 by the Home Affairs Department, it is a part of the Cheung Chau Family Trail. The whole trail is about 850 metres long, locating at the back of Kwun Yam Beach and on the headland of Chi Ma Hang, southeast of Cheung Chau. The name “Mini Great Wall” is given from the line of granite railings which looks similar to the Great Wall of China. The trail passes by a variety of specially-shaped rocks including the Loaf Rock, the Rock of Ringing Bell, the Eagle Rock, Fa Peng Rock, Human Head Rock, Rock of the Skull, Yuk Saai Shek, and Tortoise Rock.

Trail

The route provides some stunning precedence points for people to admire the South China Sea as well as up close and personal views of strangely shaped rocks peppering the trail. The locals have given some of the rock formations descriptive names.

Rocks
There are 16 famous special-shaped rocks along the path. All of these rocks are granite and are weathered into different shapes. The rocks got their names with regard to their appearances. Most of the rocks went through honeycomb weathering, block disintegration and granular disintegration.

Loaf Rock 
The Loaf Rock is a stack, which is a coastal erosional landform. It was originally the headland of Chi Ma Hang, where cracks formed after rapid hydraulic erosion. The cracks enlarged and formed a cave.  When it was further eroded, an arch was formed.  Once the overhanging part of the sea arch collapsed, a free-standing stack was left over, which was the loaf-like Loaf Rock.

Rock of the Ringing Bell 
Rock of the Ringing Bell is a tor which looks like a ringing bell. It is located near the Fa Peng Rock.
Honeycomb weathering takes place on Rock of the Ringing Bell. Salt sprays from seawater dissolved chemical materials in the rock and so produced a honeycomb look.

Eagle Rock 
The Eagle Rock is located near Fa Peng Rock. It looks like an eagle standing on the coast facing to the South China Sea.

Fa Peng Rock 
Fa Peng (vase) Rock is one of the most famous tor in Hong Kong. The rocks were originally below the ground surface. As the main rock type in Cheung Chau is granite, chemical weathering can easily take place. Due to the presence of deep weathering profiles, granite layer on the top turned into fine-sized soil by spheroidal weathering, and granite on the bottom turned into big, rounded corestones. When the overlying soil was removed by external medium such as wind and rain, the corestone piled up and formed this vase-looking tor. Honeycomb weathering has also been taking place on Fa Peng Rock ongoingly.

Human Head Rock 

Human Head Rock is the most famous rock along the path. From the side view, the rock bears the outline of a human face. Honeycomb weathering takes place on Human Head Rock. Deep pits like honeycombs are found on the surface of the rock due to solution of chemical materials by water. In addition, granular disintegration takes place. It is a kind of physical weathering. As different minerals expand and contract at variable rates during daytime and nighttime, different minerals may lose grains by repeated expansion and contraction. Grains are then finally scattered at the base of rocks.

Rock of the Skull 

Rock of the Skull is located near Human Head Rock. It resembles the skull with hollows at the positions of the eyes formed by honeycomb weathering and granular disintegration.

Yuk Saai Shek 
Yuk Saai (imperial jade seal) Shek is located at the end of the Mini Great Wall. Honeycomb weathering and granular disintegration take place.

Tortoise Rock 
Tortoise Rock is located beneath the Zombie Rock. Block disintegration took place in which the rock broke apart like slices of bread by physical weathering. It occurred in well-jointed rocks and an environment which large diurnal range of temperature. After repeated expansion and contraction, joints enlarged causing large masses to split away from the main rock.

Scenery

Facilities
The whole trail has a line railings of approximately 30 metres long in total, 10-metre-long chain link balusters, 12 tours and 7 direction signages established by the Home Affairs Department in 2011. There are also two lookout pavilions on the trail for travellers to take a rest. Fire beaters are also provided by the H.A.D. for putting out hill fire.

Access
Go to Central Pier 5 and take a ferry to Cheung Chau (for around 55–60 minutes or 35–40 minutes respectively depending on aboarding the ordinary ferry or the fast ferry). Reach the Tung Wan Beach by walking along Tung Wan Road for around 10 minutes from the Cheung Chau ferry pier . Then, walk along Cheung Chau Beach Road for approximately 15 minutes and walk towards Kwun Yam Temple until arriving at the entrance of the Mini Great Wall.

Gallery

References

Cheung Chau